Dave Fultz (August 12, 1921 – July 25, 2002) was an American professor of meteorology, known for his research on atmospheric air movements and hydrodynamics.

Fultz received his bachelor's degree in 1941 and a certificate in meteorology in 1942 from the University of Chicago. In 1942 he was an assistant at the Chicago Station of the United States Weather Bureau. From 1942 to 1944 he was an instructor at the University of Puerto Rico, as well as a research associate at the University of Chicago. In 1945 he was an operations analyst for the United States Army Air Forces. In 1947 Fultz received his Ph.D. in meteorology from the University of Chicago, where he spent the remainder of his career. There he was from 1946 to 1992 head of the Hydrodynamics Laboratories. From 1947 to 1948 he was an instructor in meteorology and in 1948 was appointed an assistant professor. In 1960 he was promoted from associate professor to full professor, retiring in 1992 as professor emeritus. From 1959 to 1963 he was a member of the U.S. Air Force's Scientific Advisory Board.

Fultz was a Guggenheim Fellow for the academic year 1950–1951 at the University of Cambridge.

He married Jean L. McEldowney (1921–1998) on April 6, 1946. They had two daughters and a son.

The Dave Fultz Memorial Laboratory for Hydrodynamics was officially opened in June 2005.

Selected publications

References

1921 births
2002 deaths
American meteorologists
National Weather Service people
University of Chicago alumni
University of Chicago faculty
Members of the United States National Academy of Sciences
United States Army Air Forces personnel of World War II